Boujemaa Benkhrif (born 1947) is a Moroccan former footballer who played as adefender for the Morocco national team in the 1970 FIFA World Cup. He also played for KAC Kenitra. Also, Benkhrif was a risk technician.

References

Living people
1947 births
Moroccan footballers
Morocco international footballers
Association football defenders
KAC Kénitra players
Botola players
1970 FIFA World Cup players
1972 African Cup of Nations players
Footballers at the 1972 Summer Olympics
Olympic footballers of Morocco
People from Kenitra